Khao Chum Thong Junction railway station is a railway station located in Khuan Koei Subdistrict, Ron Phibun District, Nakhon Si Thammarat. This station is the junction for the Southern Line mainline and the Nakhon Si Thammarat Branch Line.

History 
Khao Chum Thong Junction opened as a junction railway station in October 1914, along the Thung Song Junction–Phatthalung section of the Southern Line. Initially, the station was called "Sam Yaek Nakhon" (lit. Three-way Junction for Nakhon [Si Thammarat]). Later the name was changed to the current name in 1917, under the orders of King Vajiravudh.

In the past Khao Chum Thong was a station that all trains must stop as it was a water and wood fueling station. However, these facilities were removed in 1982, when no more steam locomotives were used.

Train services 
 Express train No. 85 / 86 Bangkok–Nakhon Si Thammarat–Bangkok
 Rapid train No. 169 / 170 Bangkok–Yala–Bangkok
 Rapid train No. 173 / 174 Bangkok–Nakhon Si Thammarat–Bangkok
 Local train No. 445 / 446 Chumphon–Hat Yai–Chumphon
 Local train No. 447 / 448 Surat Thani–Sungai Kolok–Surat Thani
 Local train No. 451/452 Nakhon Si Thammarat–Sungai Kolok–Nakhon Si Thammarat
 Local train No. 455/456 Nakhon Si Thammarat–Yala–Nakhon Si Thammarat
 Local train No. 457/458 Nakhon Si Thammarat–Phatthalung–Nakhon Si Thammarat

In popular culture
This junction railway station was cited in the 1965 Thai action film Chum Thang Khao Chum Thong as a backdrop of story and the theme song, which shares the same Thai title as the film and was performed by Rapin Phutai, also became a memorable luk thung (Thai country song) hit.

References 
 
 
 
 
 

Railway stations in Thailand
Railway stations opened in 1914